The 1921 Tour de France was the 15th edition of the Tour de France, taking place 26 June to 24 July. The race was won by Belgian Leon Scieur. The Belgians dominated the entire race, partly due to the absence of the French Pélissier brothers, who were on bad terms with the Tour organisation. Scieur's victory was largely uncontested; Hector Heusghem came close after the sixth stage, but lost time later. The organisation tried to get the cyclists to attack more by several means, but this failed.

Innovations and changes
The 1920 Tour de France had been dominated by Belgian cyclists, who won twelve of the fifteen stages, and the top seven of the overall classification. The French cyclists Henri and Francis Pélissier had left the 1920 Tour de France after Henri received a penalty from the Tour organisation for throwing away a tire, and they were still fighting. Therefore, the Pélissier brothers did not join the 1921 Tour de France. Two veteran cyclists who did join the race were Ernest Paul and Lucien Pothier, both forty years old. Paul rode his first Tour de France in 1908, while Pothier had started in the first Tour de France in 1903, and finished second.

The winner of 1920, Philippe Thys, was the dominant stage racer of the time, but he was recovering from an illness and could not compete for the victory.

The economic impact of World War I was still not over, so as in the previous years there were not sponsored teams, but the cycling companies had bundled their forces under the nick La Sportive. The cyclists were divided in two categories, this time named 1ère class (first class), the professionals, and 2ème classe (second class), the amateurs. This year, some of the second class cyclists would finish higher than some of the first class cyclists.

The 1921 Tour de France saw the introduction of foreign press. They followed the race in their own cars.
For the first time, an inhabitant from Monaco joined the Tour de France. Laurent Devalle needed more than twenty-seven hours for the fifth stage, and would finally give up in the eleventh stage.

Participants

Race overview

Overall, the Tour did not have any major events. This troubled the Tour organiser and newspaper owner Henri Desgrange, who sanctioned cyclists that were not combative enough in his view.

In the first stage, Honoré Barthélemy had to fix a flat tire eleven times. Despite this, he still finished in second place behind Louis Mottiat, with Léon Scieur in third place. In the second stage, won by Romain Bellenger, Scieur finished in second place, almost one hour before Mottiat and Barthélemy, so Scieur was leading the race. Scieur improved his lead by winning the third stage, and was already leading by 12'38" over his closest opponent, Hector Heusghem.
In the fourth and fifth stage, both won by Mottiat, Scieur managed to increase his lead to almost half an hour.

In the sixth stage, the first real mountains were to be climbed. Hector Heusghem took off on the Tourmalet, reached the top there first, rode solo over the Aspin and the Peyresourde and finished with a 24-minute margin. This brought the difference between Scieur and Heusghem back to slightly over four minutes. The press predicted a new duel between Scieur and Heusghem.

The seventh and eighth stage did not change this difference. In the ninth stage the race was decided, as Heusghem lost ten minutes to Scieur. From that moment it was easy for Scieur to control the race, and the other cyclists could only ride for stage victories. In the tenth stage, Scieur punctured on the climb to Allos. It was an unwritten rule that cyclists would not attack when opponents were repairing their bicycle, but Heusghem was desperate and broke this rule. Scieur was angry, and after he completed his repair he caught back Heusghem. He then told Heusghem that this was not the way professional cyclists behaved, dropped Heusghem, and crossed the finish line first, and even added another six minutes to his lead.

The French crowd was pleased by the stage victory of Félix Goethals in stage eleven. In the twelfth stage Heusghem won, albeit in the same time as Scieur. Henri Desgrange was angry at the cyclists for not attempting to beat Scieur, so he had the cyclists leave separately in the thirteenth stage. The "second class" cyclists started two hours earlier than the sponsored "first class" cyclists. Although the stage was won by an unsponsored cyclist from the second class, Félix Sellier, this did not help for the general classification, as Scieur and Heusghem still finished together. The Tour organisers wanted the second class cyclists to start two hours later in the fourteenth stage, but they threatened with a strike, and the cyclists could start together. The fourteenth stage had a remarkable incident: Scieur's wheel broke, and 11 spokes were broken. According to the rules, a broken item could only be replaced when repair was not possible. In the last stage, Scieur finished a few minutes behind Heusghem, but his victory was never in danger.

Results
In each stage, all cyclists started together. The cyclist who reached the finish first, was the winner of the stage.
The time that each cyclist required to finish the stage was recorded. For the general classification, these times were added up; the cyclist with the least accumulated time was the race leader, identified by the yellow jersey.

Stage winners

General classification
The final general classification, calculated by adding the stages times, was won by Léon Scieur, who received 15.000 Francs. Originally, the two results of the two classes were separated, and the winner of the second class, Victor Lenaers, reportedly won 20.000 Francs in total during this race. Modern sources combine the results for the two groups.

Aftermath
As in the years before, the Belgian cyclists had dominated the entire race. The French press and audience did not like this, and wanted the brothers Pélissier, who did not join because of a fight with the Tour organisers, to enter the race again. They would ultimately do this in 1923, when Henri won the race as the first French cyclist in eleven years.
The winner in 1921, Scieur, would start the Tour three more times, but would never win a stage again and never complete the race.

Notes

References

Bibliography

External links

 
Tour de France
Tour de France
Tour de France by year
Tour de France
Tour de France